Anne Westfall is an American video game programmer and software developer, known for 1983's Archon: The Light and the Dark, originally written for the Atari 8-bit family. She is married to fellow game developer Jon Freeman. Together they founded Free Fall Associates.

Career
Westfall began computer programming at the age of 30. Before moving into the video game industry, Westfall worked as a programmer for a civil engineering firm Morton Technology, where she developed the first microcomputer-based program designed to help lay out subdivisions.

In 1981, Westfall and her husband, Jon, left Epyx, the video game developer and publisher her husband co-founded just three years earlier.  Westfall cited a desire to learn assembly language and to work on the Atari 800 as one reason for their departure from Epyx.

Together with game designer Paul Reiche III, they started Free Fall Associates to make computer games free of the politics existing at the now larger Epyx. Together with Jon and Reiche, she helped develop the two award-winning and highly acclaimed games Archon and Archon II, handling the brunt of the programming work.

For six years, Westfall was on the board of directors of the Computer Game Developers Conference.

Personal
Westfall met Jon at the West Coast Computer Faire in 1980 while demonstrating her surveying program she wrote for the TRS-80.  Her booth was next to that of Automated Simulations—later Epyx—where Jon was working. After dating for about six months, Freeman convinced Westfall to move closer and come to work at his company.

See also 

List of women in the video game industry
Women and video games
Women in computing

References

External links
 MobyGames' entry on Westfall
 Free Fall Associates chapter of Halcyon Days: Interviews with Classic Computer and Video Game Programmers

American computer programmers
Video game programmers
Year of birth missing (living people)
Living people
Women video game programmers
Computer programmers